Ela Tomson (born Ela Liimeon; 16 February 1945) is an Estonian television journalist, editor, screenwriter, and politician. She was a member of X Riigikogu.

Early life and career
Tomson was born in Pärnu. She is a 1967 graduate of Tartu State University, with a degree in journalism. During her studies, she worked as an assistant to theatre director Kaarel Ird at the Vanemuine theatre in Tartu. Later, she worked as an editor and screenwriter at Eesti Telefilm. From 1972 until 1992, she worked as an editor at Eesti Televisioon before taking a position as an editor-in-chief at Pärnu Raadio from 1992 until 1994. In 1994, she returned to Eesti Television as the editor-in-chief; a position she held until 2000. Afterward, she taught secondary school in Pärnu until 2003, when she became involved in politics.

She has been a member of Res Publica Party. In 2003, she was elected to the X Riigikogu.

Personal life
Tomson is married to film director and cinematographer Mati Põldre. From 1965 until 1973, she was married to writer and theatre director Mati Unt.

References

Living people
1945 births
Estonian screenwriters
Estonian women journalists
Estonian film editors
Res Publica Party politicians
Members of the Riigikogu, 2003–2007
Women members of the Riigikogu
University of Tartu alumni
Politicians from Pärnu
21st-century Estonian women politicians